Vojtěch Štěpán (born 8 June 1985) is a Czech football player who plays for FK Kratonohy.

References

External links

Czech footballers
1985 births
Living people
SK Sigma Olomouc players
FK Jablonec players
FC Hradec Králové players
SK Slavia Prague players
Czech First League players   

Association football midfielders